Ozokerite or ozocerite, archaically referred to as earthwax or earth wax, is a naturally occurring odoriferous mineral wax or paraffin found in many localities.   Lacking a definite composition and crystalline structure, it is not considered a mineral but only a mineraloid. The name was coined from Greek elements Όζω ozο, to stink, and κηρός keros, wax.

Sources
Specimens have been obtained from Scotland, Northumberland, Wales, as well as from about thirty different countries. Of these occurrences the ozokerite of the island (now peninsula) of Cheleken, near Türkmenbaşy Bay, parts of the Himalayas in India and the deposits of Utah in the United States, deserve mention, though the latter have been largely worked out. The sole sources of commercial supply are in Galicia, at Boryslav, Dzwiniacz and Starunia, though the mineraloid is found at other points on both flanks of the Carpathians.

Ozokerite deposits are believed to have originated in much the same way as mineral veins, the slow evaporation and oxidation of petroleum having resulted in the deposition of its dissolved paraffin in the fissures and crevices previously occupied by the liquid. As found native, ozokerite varies from a very soft wax to a black mass as hard as gypsum.

Properties
It is soluble in ether, petroleum, benzene, turpentine, chloroform, carbon disulfide and others. Galician ozokerite varies in color from light yellow to dark brown, and frequently appears green owing to dichroism. Chemically, ozokerite consists of a mixture of various hydrocarbons, containing 85-87% by weight of carbon and 14-13% of hydrogen.

Mining
In these mines there are the usual main shafts and galleries, the ozokerite being reached by levels driven along the strike of the deposit. The wax, as it reaches the surface, varies in purity, and, in new workings especially, only hand-picking is needed to separate the pure material. In other cases much earthy matter is mixed with the material, and then the rock or shale having been eliminated by hand-picking, the "wax-stone" is boiled with water in large coppers, when the pure wax rises to the surface. This is again melted without water, and the impurities are skimmed off, the material being then run into slightly conical cylindrical moulds, and thus made into blocks for the market. The crude ozokerite is refined by treatment first with sulfuric acid, and subsequently with charcoal, when the ceresine or cerasin of commerce is obtained.

On distillation in a current of superheated steam, ozokerite yields a candle-making material resembling the paraffin obtained from petroleum and shale-oil but of higher melting-point, and therefore of greater value if the candles made from it are to be used in hot climates. There are also obtained in the distillation light oils and a product resembling vaseline. The residue in the stills consists of a hard, black, waxy substance, which in admixture with India-rubber was employed under the name of okonite as an electrical insulator. From the residue a form of the material known as heel-ball, used to impart a polished surface to the heels and soles of boots, was also manufactured.

Mining of ozokerite diminished after 1940 due to competition from paraffins manufactured from petroleum. It has a higher melting point than most petroleum waxes, and is favored for some applications, such as electrical insulators and candles.

See also
Zietrisikite

References

Frank, Alison Fleig (2005). Oil Empire: Visions of Prosperity in Austrian Galicia (Harvard Historical Studies). Harvard University Press. p. 98. . 

Waxes
Hydrocarbons